The Chapel of Our Lady of the Ladder is a 16th-century Roman Catholic church located in Salvador, Bahia, Brazil. It was constructed as part of the Nossa Senhora de Escada sugar plantation by Lázaro Arévolo, likely in 1566; he donated the chapel to the Jesuits in the late 16th century. The chapel is part of the Roman Catholic Archdiocese of São Salvador da Bahia; it was listed as a historic structure by the National Institute of Historic and Artistic Heritage (IPHAN) in 1962. It and the Church and Monastery of Our Lady of Monserrate are the only remaining 16th-century chapels in Salvador.

History

The chapel was the scene of an invasion by Dutch forces during their takeover of Salvador as part of the Dutch occupation of Brazil. John Maurice, Prince of Nassau-Siegen, used the site to invade Salvador in April and May 1638. A stone plaque was placed on an exterior wall in 1930 to commemorate the event.

Structure

The chapel includes a nave, altar, sacristy, choir, enclosed porch, and belfry. The chapel, with its enclosed porch, resembles the Chapel of Our Lady of Help (Capela de Nossa Senhora da Ajuda) in Cachoeira; Chapel of Saint Joseph of Jenipapo (Capela de São José do Jenipapo) in Castro Alves; and the Chapel of Saint Antony of Velásquez in Vera Cruz, Itaparica Island. An image of Our Lady of the Ladder dates to the 18th century. The pulpit is accessed via an outer stair.

Protected status

The National Institute of Historic and Artistic Heritage restored the façade of the chapel in 1966, removing its Baroque-style pediment and restoring its design, in theory, to its original form. Further work was carried out to stabilize the building structure due to the risk of collapse in 2007.

Protected status

The Chapel of Our Lady of the Ladder was listed as a historic structure by the National Institute of Historic and Artistic Heritage in 1962.

Access

The Chapel of Our Lady of the Ladder is open to the public and may be visited.

References

Roman Catholic churches in Salvador, Bahia
16th-century Roman Catholic church buildings in Brazil
National heritage sites of Bahia
Portuguese colonial architecture in Brazil